The King's Gallantry Medal (KGM) is a United Kingdom decoration awarded for exemplary acts of bravery where the services were not so outstanding as to merit the George Medal, but above the level required for the King's Commendation for Bravery.

History
The Queen's Gallantry Medal was instituted on 20 June 1974 to replace the Order of the British Empire for Gallantry and the British Empire Medal for Gallantry, which ended the anomaly where the Order of the British Empire for Gallantry was awarded for lesser acts of bravery than the George Medal but took precedence over it in the Order of Wear. In addition, the QGM replaced the Colonial Police Medal for Gallantry (the last award of which was made in November 1974). It de facto replaced awards of the Sea Gallantry Medal, but this has never been formally announced.

The Royal Warrant for the Queen's Gallantry Medal was amended on 30 November 1977 to allow for posthumous awards, as was that for the George Medal. 

During the reign of Queen Elizabeth II between June 1974 and September 2022, and in a final list published in March 2023 after her death, there were 1,101 awards announced in The London Gazette, including 19 second award bars. The armed forces received 542 awards and civilians, including police, 559 (including 120 to the Royal Ulster Constabulary, almost twice as many as any other group). Forty-two of the awards were posthumous, and 27 were to women.

In September 2022 the Queen's Gallantry Medal was renamed the King's Gallantry Medal following the accession of King Charles III.

Criteria
The medal is awarded for "exemplary acts of bravery" by civilians, and by members of the Armed Forces for "actions for which purely military Honours are not normally granted".

Description
The medal is silver and circular in shape, 36 mm in diameter, with the following design:
 The obverse of the QGM shows the crowned portrait of Queen Elizabeth II by Cecil Thomas and is inscribed "ELIZABETH II DEI GRATIA REGINA F.D.".
 The reverse of the QGM (designed by Reynolds Stone CBE, RDI) bears the image of a St Edward's Crown above the words 'The Queen's Gallantry Medal' in four lines, flanked by laurel sprigs.
 The 32 mm wide ribbon is of "Garter" blue, with a central stripe of pearl grey, within which is a narrow stripe of rose pink; the grey and rose colours represent the Order of the British Empire, which the medal replaced. While awards to women generally have the ribbon fashioned into a bow, female recipients in the armed forces or civilian uniformed services have the medal presented with the ribbon in the same style as for male recipients.
 The name of the recipient is impressed on the rim of the medal. When awarded to members of the Armed Forces, service number, rank, and unit are also included.
 A further award of the medal is indicated by a silver bar ornamented with laurel leaves worn on the ribbon. When the ribbon alone is worn, a silver rosette denotes award of the bar.
Recipients are entitled to the post-nominal letters "Q.G.M" or "K.G.M.".

Notable recipients
Among the more notable recipients are:
 Charles Bruce, former 22 Special Air Service Soldier. Awarded in November 1986 for his conduct in Operation Banner, Northern Ireland in December 1984.
 Peter Edmonds, Metropolitan Police Officer. Awarded in March 1974 for his actions during the kidnap attempt of Anne, Princess Royal.
 Guy Edwards, former Formula 1 driver. Awarded for assisting in the rescue of Niki Lauda from his blazing Ferrari 312T at the 1976 German Grand Prix at the Nürburgring.
 John Leonard Graham GM. Detective Senior Constable, Queensland Police Service. Awarded in 1976 for the rescue of 36 occupants of the Coolangatta Hotel, after an arsonist set the hotel on fire on New Years Day, 1975. Anthony Lacon and Ian Rogers also received the QGM for this rescue. Graham had previously been awarded the George Medal for bravery in 1973, and was subsequently awarded the Queen's Commendation for Brave Conduct.
 Daniel Hellings, a 19-year-old Private from the 2nd Mercian Regiment of the British Army. Awarded in 2010 for uncovering several IED bombs in a combat situation in Helmand Province, Afghanistan. 
Chris Jewell and Jason Mallinson, two members of the British teams involved in the 2018 Tham Luang cave rescue.
 Anthony David Lacon (now Hewett-Lacon), a 23-year-old Queensland Police officer. Awarded in 1976 for multiple rescues from the Coolangatta Hotel fire, when John Graham and Ian Rogers also received the QGM.
 Stephen Oake, an anti-terrorism detective who was given the award posthumously after being murdered in Crumpsall, Manchester by Islamic terrorist Kamel Bourgass. Oake had prevented the al-Qaeda member from attacking his colleagues, despite being unarmed himself and having suffered eight serious stab wounds.
 Ian Kenneth Rogers, a 21-year-old Queensland Police officer. Awarded in 1976 for multiple rescues from the Coolangatta Hotel fire, when John Graham and Anthony Lacon also received the QGM.
 John Smeaton, former Baggage Handler. Awarded in December 2007 for his actions in the 2007 Glasgow International Airport attack.
 Ranger Cyril J. Smith, 2nd Bn Royal Irish Rangers; killed by a proxy bomb at a border checkpoint at Killeen, County Armagh, Northern Ireland on 24 October 1990. A Catholic man, Patrick Gillespie, who had been a civilian employee of the British Army, was forced to drive where the soldiers would be, or his two sons would be shot. He was to tell the soldiers they had forty minutes to get clear but within seconds of reaching the checkpoint, the bomb exploded. Smith, also a Catholic, died trying to warn colleagues and was awarded the Queens Gallantry Medal posthumously.
 Dominic Troulan. Awarded in May 1996 for service in Northern Ireland. After service in the Royal Marines and British Army, in June 2017 he became the first living British civilian to be awarded the George Cross since 1974 and the first holder of both the George Cross and the QGM.
Stanley MacLeod. Diving Superintendent on the Piper Alpha Oil Platform for leading 19 men to safety after the North Sea structure exploded.
David Michael Groves. Royal Navy sailor on HMS Argyll. Awarded on 25 Feb 2020, for the dramatic rescue of 27 mariners from Grande America, which caught fire in rough seas in the Bay of Biscay.
Leon McLeod. Police Constable, British Transport Police. Awarded in October 2018 for his actions during the 2017 London Bridge attack
Michael Hooper. Police Sergeant, Leicestershire Police. Awarded in May 2021 for his actions during the helicopter crash outside Leicester City Football club
Stephen Quartermain. Police Constable, Leicestershire Police. Awarded in May 2021 for his actions during the helicopter crash outside Leicester City Football club

See also
 British and Commonwealth orders and decorations
 Royal Logistic Corps Operational Honours

References

Sources
 
 
 
 
 Amending Royal Warrants to the George Medal and Queen's Gallantry Medal dated 30 November 1977.

Civil awards and decorations of the United Kingdom
Decorations of the Merchant Navy
 
Courage awards
Elizabeth II
Awards established in 1974
1974 establishments in the United Kingdom